DXKM (106.3 FM), broadcasting as Magic 106.3, is a radio station owned by Advanced Media Broadcasting System and operated by Quest Broadcasting Inc.. Its studio, offices and transmitter are located at the 3rd Floor, Valencia Bldg., Pendatun Ave., General Santos.

The station was formerly known as Killerbee 106.3 from August 1991 to April 2013. Along with the other Killerbee stations, it was relaunched under the Magic moniker (adopted from its parent station) by April 29, 2013.

References

External links
Magic 106.3 FB Page

Radio stations in General Santos
Contemporary hit radio stations in the Philippines
Radio stations established in 1991
Quest Broadcasting